Saint Bernard, officially the Municipality of Saint Bernard (Kabalian: Lungsod san Saint Bernard;), is a 4th class municipality in the province of Southern Leyte, Philippines. According to the 2020 census, it has a population of 28,414 people.

History

This town was formerly the largest barrio of San Juan, then known as "Himatagon". On December 9, 1954, President Ramon Magsaysay issued Executive Order No. 84, converting the barrio as a municipality of Saint Bernard. It was through the efforts of Leyte Governor Bernardo Torres that the conversion was made possible in response to the lingering clamour of the inhabitants for an independent and separate municipality from San Juan. As a gratitude to Governor Bernardo Torres, the people unanimously renamed Himatagon as Saint Bernard, with the honorific title "Saint" being a translation of the vernacular honorific "San" which is given to persons of virtue, wisdom or generosity and the name Bernard being the English version of the name Bernardo.

On February 17, 2006, a tragic series of mudslides killed over 1100 residents in Barangay Guinsaugon. Affected families were treated by the Philippine government and other non-government organizations from all over the world.  New houses were built, and the people chose New Guinsaugon as the name of their village located near the town proper.

Geography
It is situated on the Pacific coast and the first town form the mountain road from the eastern side of Sogod Bay.

Barangays
Saint Bernard is politically subdivided into 30 barangays but only 28 are considered truly functioning barangays.

Climate

Demographics

Economy

Saint Bernard's economy are based in agriculture and marine culture. The municipality is considered among the fastest growing economy in the pacific area of Southern Leyte.

Saint Bernard is a peninsula and therefore it is almost entirely surrounded by water. The majority of the people who live in the flat lands engage in fishing as their main mode of livelihood. Those who live in the mountain barangays, live through farming.

The common mode of transportation is by bicycles with side cars, known locally as Potpot or pedicabs or, depending on the distance, tricycles with side cars, called trisikads or center cab.
The LGU established the Saint Bernard Town Center for economic activities of some Small to Medium Entrepreneurs.

Tourism
Hindag An Falls- Barangay Hindag-an
Tinago Beach- Barangay Magbagacay
Tinago Spring Falls- Barangay Ayahag
Lipanto Marine Sanctuary- Barangay Lipanto
Himbangan Bird Sanctuary- Barangay Himbangan
Sangat Cave and Beach- Barangay Hindag-an
Saub Beach- Barangay Lipanto
Ground Zero Memorial Park & Lawigan River- Lawigan River, access at Brgy Tambis 1
Libas River- Barangay Libas
Kissbone Cove and Resort- Barangay Magbagacay
Santo Nino Shrine - Sitio Cansi, Barangay Himatagon
Mun. Disaster Management Office - LGU Compound, Municipal Building, Barangay Himatagon

Education
There are accessible Elementary Schools in every Barangay in the Municipality of Saint Bernard as of 2019 census.

List of Secondary Schools in the Municipality of Saint Bernard.
Tambis National High School- Barangay Tambis 1
Himbangan National High School- Barangay Himbangan
Cristo Rey Regional High School- BarangayMalibago
New Guinsaugon National High School - Relocation area of New Guinsaugon, Magbagacay

References

External links

 
 [ Philippine Standard Geographic Code]
Local Governance Performance Management System

Municipalities of Southern Leyte
Establishments by Philippine executive order